Wahtum Lake is a lake in Hood River County, Oregon, United States, in the Mark O. Hatfield Wilderness of the Mount Hood National Forest. "Wahtum" comes from the Sahaptin language, and means "pond' or "body of water.".

Less than 0.25 miles from a trailhead reachable by paved road, Wahtum Lake is a popular recreation destination. Several campsites exist at the trailhead and there are backcountry sites on the shore of the lake itself. A dense network of trails exists around the lake, with several leading  down to the Columbia River. The Pacific Crest Trail wraps around Wahtum Lake, while the Eagle Creek Trail #440 — the most popular trail in the Gorge — has its upper terminus at Wahtum Lake.

References

Columbia River Gorge
Lakes of Hood River County, Oregon
Lakes of Oregon